The Definitive Collection is a 2005 album compiled mostly from Moorer's first five studio albums. Stephen Thomas Erlewine of AllMusic states that "The Definitive Collection is less of a hits album than a retrospective on an underappreciated artist."

Critical reception

Stephen Thomas Erlewine of AllMusic referencing Moorer's earlier studio albums says, "Each of these records is quite good on its own terms, but this makes for an excellent introduction for the curious, and The Definitive Collection a strong listen in its own right as well."

Michael Franco of PopMatters writes, "Overall, The Definitive Collection is an essential purchase for fans of country, alt-country, folk, and roots rock."

Track listing

Track information and credits adapted from the album's liner notes. Some details for original albums adapted from ''AllMusic.

References

External links
Allison Moorer Official Site
Universal Music Group Official Site

Allison Moorer albums
2005 compilation albums
Universal Records compilation albums